Gordon Mar is an American politician from San Francisco. He was a member of the San Francisco Board of Supervisors from 2019 to 2023, representing District 4. He is the brother of former District 1 supervisor Eric Mar.

District 4 includes the western San Francisco neighborhoods of Central Sunset, Outer Sunset, Parkside, Outer Parkside, and Pine Lake Park.

Political Career 
He was Executive Director of Jobs with Justice San Francisco and the Chinese Progressive Association.

San Francisco Board of Supervisors 
After incumbent District 4 Supervisor Katy Tang declined to run for re-election in 2018, Mar filed papers to run for the District 4 seat in the November election. In the months leading up to the race, the campaigns of both Mar and his primary opponent, Jessica Ho, were criticized for "mudslinging" tactics. A Mar campaign staffer was caught tearing down a poster for Ho. 

Mar was elected supervisor for District 4 on November 6, 2018, receiving 10,314 first preference votes (36.29 percent of all valid votes). After allocation of preferences from eliminated candidates in San Francisco's ranked-choice voting system, Mar received 56.84 percent of final-round votes, compared to 43.16 percent for runner-up Jessica Ho, an aide to the incumbent supervisor Katy Tang.

Mar led negotiations with San Francisco Mayor London Breed to fully fund City College of San Francisco's free tuition program for ten years beginning in 2019, and negotiated a deal to provide full reserve funding for raises for San Francisco Unified School District educators.

Mar has called on SFPD to release aggregated demographic data on Asian-American crime victims, following an increase in hate crimes in San Francisco and several high-profile attacks on members of the Chinese community, and announced legislation requiring this data to be released annually. 

Mar is the author of a number of ordinances reforming San Francisco's electoral system and addressing money in politics, including 2019's Proposition F addressing pay-to-play politics, corporate contributions, and dark-money donations, and Public Financing 2.0, which tripled the impact of San Francisco's public financing program for elections.

In November 2022, Mar lost his bid for re-election to Joel Engardio. With the redistricting process, Engardio was eligible to run in District 4 after running and losing three prior campaigns for Supervisor in District 7. With this loss, Mar became the first elected Supervisor in the ranked-choice era to lose their reelection bid.

Positions on housing 
Mar spearheaded multiple Board of Supervisors resolutions which denounced California State Senator Scott Weiner's SB 50 bill, which would have legalized higher density housing development in areas close to public transit. When asked to explain why he voted to block the construction of a 495-unit apartment complex (with 25% affordable housing) on a Nordstrom's valet parking lot in the South of Market neighborhood, Mar said there was an abundance of available "luxury units" in the neighborhood and families "can check Craigslist today" to find housing.

Mar opposes building a Navigation Center in District 4.

When asked to comment on legislation that would permit construction of fourplexes across the city, Mar said "a modest density increase to single-family zoning is certainly worth considering" in San Francisco but did not specify further. Later in 2021, amid debates to allow the construction of four housing units on lots previously designated for single-family housing, Mar proposed to prohibit the construction of market-rate housing on the upzoned lots. 

In November 2021, Mar proposed to scale down a 98-unit low-income apartment complex in the Sunset District so that it would only have 80 units. Mar characterized this as a compromise between supporters and opponents of the apartment complex. 

In January 2022, Mar defended the delay in approval for a $18.7 million grant to repurpose a hotel into a homeless shelter for upwards of 250 people. Mar said, "We’re all well aware of the urgency of this work. But I would echo the comments of my colleagues that we can’t use that urgency to go through a bad process."

Personal life
His wife Cecilia is a realtor. Together, they are landlords.

References

Additional sources

 
 
  

California politicians of Chinese descent
Living people
San Francisco Board of Supervisors members
21st-century American politicians
California Democrats
Year of birth missing (living people)